Polyglycerol polyricinoleate
Plant-growth promoting rhizobacteria